The Falls of Halladale was a four-masted iron-hulled barque that was built in 1886 for the long-distance bulk carrier trade. Built for the Falls Line (Wright, Breakenridge & Co., Glasgow, Scotland) at the shipyard of Russell & Co., Greenock on the River Clyde, she was named after a waterfall on the Halladale River in the Caithness district of Scotland. The ship's design was advanced for her time, incorporating features that improved crew safety and efficiency such as elevated bridges to allow the crew to move between forward and aft in relative safety during heavy seas.

The Falls of Halladale was the seventh vessel in a series of eight similar iron-hulled sailing ships, all built by Russell & Co and all named after waterfalls in Scotland.  The Falls of Halladale was preceded by the Falls of Clyde (1878), the Falls of Bruar (1879), the Falls of Dee (1882), the Falls of Afton (1882), the Falls of Foyers (1883) and the Falls of Earn (1884).  The Falls of Halladale was followed by a sister ship, the Falls of Garry (1886).   The Falls of Clyde is afloat today and is a major attraction at the Hawaii Maritime Center in Honolulu.

Sinking

The Falls of Halladale is best known for her spectacular demise in a shipwreck near Peterborough, Victoria on the shipwreck coast of Victoria, Australia.  On the night of 14 November 1908 she was sailed in dense fog directly onto the rocks due to a navigational error.   The crew of 29 abandoned ship safely and all made it ashore by boat, leaving the ship foundering with her sails set. For weeks after the wreck large crowds gathered to view the ship as she gradually broke up and then sank in the shallow water.

Soon after the accident the ship's master, Capt. David Wood Thomson, was brought before a Court of Marine Inquiry in Melbourne and found guilty of a gross act of misconduct, having carelessly navigated the ship, having neglected to take proper soundings, and having failed to place the ship on a port tack before it became too late to avoid the shipwreck.  Capt. Thomson's punishment included a small fine and he had his Certificate of Competency as a Master suspended for six months.

Today the Falls of Halladale is a popular destination for recreational divers.  The wreck is easily accessible by scuba divers about 300 m offshore in 3 to 15 m of water.  The hull lies on its collapsed starboard side.  Some of the original cargo of 56,763 roof slates remains at the site of the wreck along with corroded masses of what used to be coils of barbed wire.  Twenty-two thousand slates were salvaged in the 1980s and used to provide roofing at the Flagstaff Hill Maritime Village in Warrnambool.  An anchor that was recovered in 1974 is on display at the village.  The wreck of the Falls of Halladale is a legally protected Historic Shipwreck.

References

Loney, Jack Kenneth, Falls of Halladale, Marine History Publications, Geelong, VIC, Australia, 1976, .
MacGillivray, Jessie Scott, The Wreck of the Falls of Halladale: an Account from the Diary of Jessie Scott MacGillibray, Peterborough 1908–1911, published by Richard & Jenny Stevens, Timboon, VIC, Australia, 2008, .
 Christopher, Peter. Australian Shipwrecks. A Pictorial History. Axiom Publishing, Stepney, South Australia, 2009. .

External links

Falls of Halladale
Final voyage of the Falls of Halladale
Clyde-Built Ship Database
Flagstaff Hill Maritime Village website
 

Shipwrecks of Victoria (Australia)
Barques
Windjammers
Four-masted ships
Ships of Scotland
Ships built on the River Clyde
History of Victoria (Australia)
Maritime incidents in 1908
1886 ships